Cameron Phillip Taylor (born 3 June 1971) is a New Zealand sprinter. He competed in the men's 200 metres at the 1992 Summer Olympics.

References

New Zealand male sprinters
1971 births
Living people
Athletes (track and field) at the 1992 Summer Olympics
Olympic athletes of New Zealand